The men's super-G competition of the 2017 Winter Universiade was held at Shymbulak Ski Resort, Almaty, Kazakhstan on January 30, 2017.

Results

External links
Alpine Skiing: Men's Super-G results

Men's super G